Charles Herbert Brereton (January 8, 1845 – September 6, 1908) was an Ontario doctor and political figure. He represented Durham East in the Legislative Assembly of Ontario from 1882 to 1886 as a Conservative member.

He was born in West Gwillimbury, Canada West in 1845, the son of Cloudesley Shovell Brereton who came to Upper Canada from Norfolk, England. He studied at Victoria College in Cobourg and, after completing his studies in medicine, set up practice in Bethany. He married Eliza L. Proctor in 1876. Brereton was first elected to the provincial assembly in a by-election held after the death of John Rosevear and was reelected in the general election held in 1883. He served as lieutenant in the Durham Field Battery for a number of years. Brereton was a member of the local Freemason lodge.

He died at his son's home in Saskatchewan in 1908.

References 

The Canadian parliamentary companion, 1883 JA Gemmill
Member's parliamentary history for the Legislative Assembly of Ontario
A Cyclopæedia of Canadian biography : being chiefly men of the time ... GM Rose (1886)

1845 births
1908 deaths
Progressive Conservative Party of Ontario MPPs
People from Simcoe County
19th-century Canadian politicians